Brunnen railway station is a railway station serving the resort of Brunnen, in the Swiss canton of Schwyz and municipality of Ingenbohl. It is located on the Gotthard railway, and is served by long-distance trains as well as by commuter and suburban trains.

History 
After some argument between the inhabitants of Brunnen and those of Ingenbohl about the location, the station was opened in 1882, when the Gotthardbahn opened the section from Immensee to Bellinzona. In 1903 the station was rebuilt because the older station had become too small for the amount of traffic.
In 2004, the station became part of the networks of the S-Bahn Luzern and Stadtbahn Zug.

Services 
In the 1960s and '70s, Brunnen hosted international trains to Lecce, in Italy, and Hook of Holland, in the Netherlands.

Goods station 
Until 2004 there was a Service Center of SBB Cargo to the north of the station. Today, the buildings are partly used by a Kart Racing track. The remainder of the building is scheduled to be demolished in the near future, in order to allow the construction of a new block of houses.

References

External links
 
 

Railway stations in Switzerland opened in 1882
Railway stations in the canton of Schwyz
Swiss Federal Railways stations